Ludwigsparkstadion is a multi-purpose stadium in Saarbrücken, Germany. It was built in 1953 and holds 35,303 people. After renovation from 2016 to 2021 which costs about € 46,5 million (€ 16 million were previewed), the capacity is reduced to around 16,000 seats.

It is currently used mostly for football matches and concerts.

It served as the home ground for the Saarland national football team, which existed 1950–56, during the era of the Saar Protectorate.

Gallery

References

1. FC Saarbrücken
Football venues in Germany
Buildings and structures in Saarbrücken
Multi-purpose stadiums in Germany
Sports venues in Saarland
American football venues in Germany
1953 establishments in Saar
Sports venues completed in 1953